The Indian locomotive class WAG-4 is a class of 25 kV AC electric locomotives that was manufactured by CLW in the late 1960s for Indian Railways. The model name stands for broad gauge (W), AC Current (A), Goods traffic (G) engine, 1st (1). A total of 186 WAG-4 locomotives were built by The European Group 50 Hz Group/European Group/50 Cycles Group (consortium) between 1967 and 1969. They entered service in 1967.

The WAG-4 served both passenger and freight trains for over 40 years. As of January 2020, All locomotives have been removed from service all but one were scrapped.

History 
The first fifty-six locomotive's equipment were procured from European Group. They had Auxiliary machines and some control equipments have been procured from indigenous sources. All these locomotives were built by CLW. The typical feature of these locomotives is Monomotor Bogie. This construction results in substantial saving in weight in traction equipment and gives better adhesion. These locomotives utilise silicon rectifiers for conversion of ac power into dc. The traction motors are force ventilated and are fully suspended type. These motors are permanently grouped in parallel and speed control is obtained through HT tap changer and TM field weakening.

These locomotives can be used for a multiple unit operation to a maximum of four locomotives with compressed air brake for the loco and vacuum brake for the train are provided. In addition, these locomotives are also provided with rheostatic braking. Few locomotives have been converted to dual brake system later on by Railways.

Specification 
Build dates: 1966-71
Wheel arrangement: B-B ( monomotor bogies like WAG 1 )
Traction Motors: ACEC make, MG 1580 A1 (1160 kW, 1270 V, 1040 A, 690 rpm, weight 5850 kg). Fully suspended, bogie-mounted.
Gear Ratio: 3.95 : 1
Transformer: Oerlikon BOT 3460. 32 taps.
Rectifiers: Two GL 82220 silicon rectifiers, 1000 A / 1270 kW/1270 V. Weight 650 kg each.
Axle Load: 21.9 t
Hauling capacity: 2000 t
Manufacturer:Chittaranjan Locomotive Works ( CLW )
Variants
WAG-4D (D stands for Dual braking ie it can haul both vacuum and air brake stock wagons)

Locomotive shed 
  All the locomotives of this class has been withdrawn from service.

See also

Rail transport in India#History
Indian Railways
Locomotives of India
Rail transport in India

References

External links 
[IRFCA] Indian Railways FAQ: Locomotives—Specific classes : AC Electric
[IRFCA] Indian Railways FAQ: Diesel and Electric Locomotive Specifications
11081 Colour Photographs, Indian Railways

25 kV AC locomotives
B-B locomotives
Electric locomotives of India
Railway locomotives introduced in 1967
5 ft 6 in gauge locomotives
Chittaranjan Locomotive Works locomotives